East Side Story is a 2006 romantic comedy film written, produced, and directed by Carlos Portugal and starring Rene Alvarado, Steve Callahan, and Gladise Jimenez.

Plot
East Side Story is the story of Diego (René Alvarado), a young, closeted Latino, who helps his grandmother (Irene DeBari) run the family restaurant while carrying on a relationship with equally closeted Pablo (David Berón).

Diego has long felt trapped by the conservative culture of East LA and plans to move away and open an upscale restaurant, hopefully with his lover, but Pablo views their relationship very differently - a point driven home when he begins dating Diego's Aunt Bianca (Gladise Jimenez). At the same time, Wesley and his boyfriend move in, gentrifying the neighborhood. The attraction between Wesley and Diego is immediate and electric, forcing both men to reexamine their state of affairs.

Cast
 René Alvarado as Diego Campos
 Steve Callahan as Wesley Henderson
 Gladise Jimenez as Bianca Campos
 David Berón as Pablo Morales
 Irene DeBari as Sara Campos
 Yelyna De Leon as Tiffany
 Luis Raúl as Salvador
 Cory Alan Schneider as Jonathon Webber
 Luis Accinelli as Don Rogelio
 Martin Morales as Luis
 Ruben Rabasa as Efrain Morales
 Chris Franco as Mr. Martinez
 Michael Cormier as Dan

Release
East Side Story was released at the Newfest Film Festival on June 7, 2006. The film was then released in limited cities on October 9, 2006.

Awards
The film won the GLAAD Media Award for Outstanding TV Movie or Limited Series.

References

External links
 
 

2006 romantic comedy films
2006 films
American independent films
American LGBT-related films
American romantic comedy films
Films about interracial romance
Gay-related films
2000s Spanish-language films
2000s English-language films
2006 multilingual films
American multilingual films
2006 independent films
2000s American films